The California Public Records Act (Statutes of 1968, Chapter 1473; currently codified as Chapter 3.5 of Division 7 of Title 1 of the California Government Code) was a law passed by the California State Legislature and signed by governor Ronald Reagan in 1968 requiring inspection or disclosure of governmental records to the public upon request, unless exempted by law.

The law is similar to the Freedom of Information Act, except that "the people have the right of access to information concerning the conduct of the people's business" is enshrined in Article 1 of the California Constitution due to California Proposition 59 (the Sunshine Amendment, 2004).

Purpose
When the legislature enacted CPRA, it expressly declared that "access to information concerning the conduct of the people's business is a fundamental and necessary right of every person in this state." Indeed, in California "access to government records has been deemed a fundamental interest of citizenship" and has emphasized that "maximum disclosure of the conduct of governmental operations [is] to be promoted by the act." By promoting prompt public access to government records, the CPRA is "intended to safeguard the accountability of government to the public." As the California Supreme Court recognized in CBS v. Block:

Public records and exemptions
In accordance with this policy, public records are broadly defined to include "any writing containing information relating to the conduct of a public's business prepared, owned, used or retained by any state or local agency regardless of physical form or characteristic[.]" Citing with approval an even broader definition of public records adopted by the California Attorney General, another court has stated:

Moreover, unless the public records of a local agency are exempt from the provisions of the CPRA, they must be made available for public inspection. Exemptions must be narrowly construed and the public agency bears the burden of proving that an exemption applies.

Most of the exemptions under the CPRA are set forth under Section 6254 and are specific as to certain records or types of records, but under Section 6255 a general exemption exists where, on the facts of the particular case, "the public interest served by not making the record public clearly outweighs the public interest served by disclosure of the record". In reviewing the propriety of an agency decision to withhold records, a court is charged with ascertaining whether nondisclosure was justified under either of these statutes.

Because the CPRA was modeled after the federal Freedom of Information Act ("FOIA"), 5 U.S.C. Section 552 et seq, courts may look to case law under FOIA in construing the CPRA.

The California Supreme Court held that when a public official or employee uses a personal account and/or device to communicate about the conduct of public business, such as e-mails or text messages, the applicable writings may be subject to disclosure under the California Public Records Act.

Orders and appeals
To facilitate prompt public access to public records, court orders either directing disclosure of public records or supporting an agency's decision of nondisclosure are immediately reviewable by an appellate court by way of an emergency petition seeking issuance of an extraordinary writ. In 1991, the California Supreme Court made clear that under this writ procedure, trial court orders are reviewable on their merits. Thus, when a trial court order under the CPRA is reviewed by an appellate court, the independent review standard is employed for legal issues and factual findings made by the trial court will be upheld if they are based on substantial evidence.

Changes to Act

On November 2, 2004, California voters overwhelmingly approved Proposition 59.  Commonly called the Sunshine Amendment, it added Article I, Section 3(b) to the California Constitution, which reads in part:

In 2013, as part of budget negotiations, the Legislature approved a plan to make certain provisions in the Act optional for local agencies. The move was done in order to save "tens of millions of dollars" in state reimbursements to local agencies that comply with the Act,  according to Legislative Analyst's Office projections.

The changes were added to the 2013 budget as rider bills AB 76 and SB 71, the former of which was vetoed by Jerry Brown. According to the bills, local agencies would no longer be required to provide the following, but are encouraged to follow them as "best practices":
 Respond to a public record request within 10 days
 Provide electronic records in its native format
 Provide a reason for denying a request

Open government advocates and several California newspapers came out strongly against the measure. Jim Ewert, general counsel of the California Newspaper Publisher's Association, called the move "the worst assault on the public's right to know I have seen in my 18 years of doing this." Several newspapers, including the Oakland Tribune, Fresno Bee, and Visalia Times-Delta, published editorials against the changes.

Because of the outcry from the media, state leaders backed down within the week and reversed the changes. The Assembly passed a measure to revoke that provision in the budget bill, which Jerry Brown signed into law.

In September 2013 the legislature approved a constitutional amendment proposal, authored by state senator Mark Leno, which would incorporate the Public Records Act into the California State Constitution. The amendment clarifies that local governments must comply with requests for publicly available documents, and requires local governments to pay the costs of those requests in full. The proposed amendment went to the voters for approval in June 2014, and was passed with 61.8% of the vote.

In 2018, the legislature enacted SB 1421, which went into effect on January 1, 2019.  The law provides that public records are not confidential if they pertain to an incident in which police discharged a firearm at a person, an incident in which police use of force resulted in death or great bodily injury, an incident in which police committed sexual assault against a member of the public, or sustained findings of police dishonesty. SB 1421 also sets relatively short timelines for withholding such records during a criminal investigation or criminal enforcement proceeding.

See also
 Bagley-Keene Act
 Brown Act
 Californians Aware
 County of Santa Clara v. California First Amendment Coalition
 Copyright status of works by subnational governments of the United States: California

Notes

References

External links
 CPRA guide from the First Amendment Project
 Constitution of California, Article 1, §3(b)
 California Government Code, §6250-§6270.5
 CalAware Today (News Blog about CPRA and Other Public Records Issues)
 Community Forum from CalAware (Public Records Access Discussion Board)

Public Records Act
Freedom of information legislation in the United States
1968 in law
1968 in California